Mihajlo Pupin Institute is an institute based in Belgrade, Serbia. It is named after Mihajlo Idvorski Pupin and is part of the University of Belgrade.

It is notable for manufacturing numerous computer systems used in SFR Yugoslavia - especially early CER and later TIM line of computers.

Departments
The institute is well known in wide range of fields. In the science community, it is known for early work in humanoid robotics.

The institute and companies owned by it compete in fields such as:
 System integration and networking, 
 Information systems for government and industry, Internet/Intranet IS
 E-commerce, e-government applications
 Decision support systems, expert systems, intelligent Internet applications, 
 Power systems control, supervision and optimization
 Process control and supervision,
 Traffic control, GPS
 Telecommunications
 Digital signal processing
 Simulators, training aids, specialised H/S systems
 Image processing 
 Real-time systems (large scale and embedded)
 Turn-key engineering solutions
 Robotics

Subsidiaries
 IMP-Automatika d.o.o. Belgrade
 IMP-Računarski sistemi d.o.o. Belgrade
 IMP-Telekomunikacije d.o.o. Belgrade
 Idvorski laboratorije d.o.o. Belgrade
 IMP-Piezotehnologija d.o.o. Belgrade
 IMP-Poslovne usluge d.o.o. Belgrade
 IMP-Naučnotehnološki park d.o.o. Belgrade

See also
 CER Computers
 HRS-100 computer
 TIM-100 and TIM-011
 Michael I. Pupin - Serbian scientist after whom this institute is named.
 History of computer hardware in the SFRY
 Rajko Tomović
 Miomir Vukobratović

References

External links
 

 
1946 establishments in Serbia
Defense companies of Serbia
Economy of Belgrade
Science and technology in Serbia
University of Belgrade
Zvezdara